Mongolia participated in the 1994 Asian Games in Hiroshima, Japan from 2 to 16 October 1994.

Medal summary

Medalists

References

Nations at the 1994 Asian Games
1944
Asian Games